Caecilius fuscopterus is a species of Psocoptera from the family Caeciliusidae that can be found in Great Britain and Ireland. It also common in countries like Austria, Belgium, Croatia, Denmark, Finland, France, Germany, Hungary, Italy, Latvia, Luxembourg. The species are blackish-orange coloured and are similar to Elipsocus abdominalis

Habitat
The species feed on trees like hawthorns, oaks and sallow. It also feed on plants such as rhododendrons.

References

Caeciliusidae
Insects described in 1799
Psocoptera of Europe